Svein-Erik Stiansen (born 6 May 1942) is a Norwegian former speed skater.

He participated in the 1968 and 1972 Olympics, and in the 1968 Winter Olympics he finished 7th in the 1500 m and 12th in the 5000 m.

Stiansen set the world record in the all-round samalog event at Madonna di Campiglio at 13–14 January 1968, after skating 41.8, 7:27.6, 2:07.7 and 15:57.1, achieving a sum of 176.982.

He became Norwegian all-round champion in 1966 and in 1967.

Stiansen is the father of Tom Stiansen, world champion in slalom skiing in 1997.

References

External links

1942 births
Living people
Norwegian male speed skaters
Olympic speed skaters of Norway
Speed skaters at the 1968 Winter Olympics
Speed skaters at the 1972 Winter Olympics
World record setters in speed skating
Sportspeople from Oslo